Vladimir Lurasov (Владимир Елевич) was a sailor from Russia, who represented his country at the 1912 Summer Olympics in Nynäshamn, Sweden in the 8 Metre.

Further reading

References

Sailors at the 1912 Summer Olympics – 8 Metre
Russian male sailors (sport)
Olympic sailors of Russia
Year of birth missing
Year of death missing